Vesicularia dubyana, known as Java moss or Singapore moss, is a species of moss native to Asia. It is common in the aquarium trade.

The species was named in honor of botanist Jean Étienne Duby.

Description
The species is monoecious and perennial, with an irregularly branched stem. In the wild, it is found on soils, rocks, and trunks of trees.

Cultivation and uses
In the aquarium trade, Java moss can refer to either V. dubyana or Taxiphyllum barbieri, and it can be difficult to distinguish between the species. Although V. dubyana was the first species to be called 'Java moss', it has been supplanted in popularity by T. barbieri. It was first introduced to aquarists in 1933.

It can withstand brackish conditions. It propagates and forms sporophytes readily, even when fully submersed.

References

Hypnaceae
Freshwater plants